Leandro Muñoz is a Filipino-born American actor.

he would receive world acclaim for his on screen status in the Drama Blockbuster Kahit Isang Saglit his on-pair screen partnerships with TV and Movie Actresses Judy Ann Santos and Claudine Barretto were successful he would also go on to do more Films such as the adult drama Lupe A Seamans Wife, and the film In Your Eyes in 2010 he has done projects with ABS-CBN(1999-2002) and TV5(2010-2012)

Early life
Muñoz is the oldest child of Patricia Garcia-Muñoz and Louie Muñoz. He is the older brother of actors Carlo Muñoz and Angelo Muñoz. His father is a brother of actress Tita Muñoz.

Personal life
Muñoz, together with son, Frankie, from a previous relationship and brother Carlo and Carlo's then girlfriend Enid Reyes, moved to the United States in 2003 after the death of their father.

Muñoz previously dated his Felina: Prinsesa ng mga Pusa co-star Iwa Moto and his Rod Santiago's The Sisters co-star Nadine Samonte during a brief return to acting.

Muñoz is currently married to Sheryl Espero, a nurse, and has a son named Mason. Muñoz's first child, now Frankie, came out as transman.

Filmography

Television

Film

Awards and nominations

References

External links

1976 births
Living people
American male actors of Filipino descent